Thubten Shedrup Ling is the first Tibetan Buddhist monastery in Australia.  It is located near Bendigo, Victoria, and is a member of the International Mahayana Institute of the Foundation for the Preservation of the Mahayana Tradition (FPMT).

In 1994 Lama Zopa Rinpoche asked Australian Buddhist monk Ven. Thubten Gyatso to establish a monastery on land near Bendigo donated by the family of Mr. Ian Green. Tenzin Gyatso, the XIVth Dalai Lama of Tibet endorsed the name: Thubten Shedrup Ling, An Oasis for Study and Practice of the Buddha's Teachings. With the architectural and financial support of Mr. Salim Lee and many individual donors, construction began in 1996. The first monks moved into Thubten Shedrup Ling in 1997.

Geshe Konchok Tsering of Sera Je Monastery in India accepted a request from Lama Zopa Rinpoche to take up residence at Thubten Shedrup Ling Monastery and be the resident teacher for adjacent Atisha Centre. He arrived there in May 2003.

See also 
Gelug
Thubten Gyatso (Australian monk)
Tibetan Buddhism

References

External links 
 Official website
 The International Mahayana Institute

Gelug monasteries
Buildings and structures in Bendigo
Buddhist monasteries in Australia
Religious buildings and structures in Victoria (Australia)
Bendigo